Lymantria antennata is a species of moth of the family Erebidae. It is found along the east coast of Australia, including New South Wales and Queensland.

The wingspan is 50 mm for males. Adult males have a hairy red body with a pale plume of hairs on the tail and pale hairs on the thorax and head. The forewings are buff with dark brown zig-zag markings, while the hindwings are pale brown. Females have reduced wings and are flightless.

External links
Australian caterpillars

Lymantria
Moths described in 1855